Wang Junfeng (born 27 July 1962) is a Chinese lawyer and politician. He is currently the President of the All China Lawyers Association and also the Global Chairman of multinational law firm King & Wood Mallesons.

Biography 
Wang was born in Tonghua County, Tonghua, Jilin province in 1962.

Education 
Wang obtained his LLB and LLM from Jilin University. He received his second LLM and a JSD from the University of California, Berkeley, Boalt Hall School of Law.

Career

Professional 
He was the principal founding partner of King & Wood PRC Lawyers, one of China's largest law firms before its 2012 combination with Australian firm Mallesons Stephens Jacques. Before founding King & Wood, Wang headed the Commercial Law Department of the China Global Law Office, which a section of the China Council for Promotion of International Trade. When private law firms were first permitted in China, Wang was among the first to launch a private firm. Wang has advised on many of China's landmark legal matters.

Political 
Wang was a Chinese Communist Party delegate to the 11th and 12th National Committee of the Chinese People's Political Consultative Conference. In 2015, Wang courted controversy during the annual national conference because the proposed resolution he brought to the conference advocated official status for the Chinese calendar, rather than issues relating to the welfare of lawyers or the rule of law in China.

Wang was the President of the All China Lawyers Association.

Wang was also selected as one of China's Outstanding Lawyers by the Ministry of Justice of China.

Previously, he was the director of the Chamber of Commerce 2005 Committee. He was also a member of the Sixth Share Issue Audit Committee of the China Securities Regulatory Commission.

References 

Living people
20th-century Chinese lawyers
21st-century Chinese lawyers
UC Berkeley School of Law alumni
Jilin University alumni
Politicians of the People's Republic of China
Chinese chairpersons of corporations
Chinese Communist Party politicians
Year of birth missing (living people)